Nicolas Rostoucher (born 15 February 1981 in Colmar, Haut-Rhin) is a freestyle and medley swimmer from France, who is on the French National Swimming Team since 2000. He has competed for his native country at three consecutive Summer Olympics, starting in 2000. In 2001 he won his first international medal at the Mediterranean Games in Tunis: gold in the 400 m individual medley.

External links
Profile Nicolas Rostoucher

1981 births
Living people
Sportspeople from Colmar
French male medley swimmers
French male freestyle swimmers
Olympic swimmers of France
Swimmers at the 2000 Summer Olympics
Swimmers at the 2004 Summer Olympics
Swimmers at the 2008 Summer Olympics
European Aquatics Championships medalists in swimming
Mediterranean Games gold medalists for France
Mediterranean Games silver medalists for France
Swimmers at the 2001 Mediterranean Games
Swimmers at the 2005 Mediterranean Games
Mediterranean Games medalists in swimming